Di Varhayt (The Truth) was a Yiddish Communist newspaper published from Petrograd, Russia, published by Evkom belonging to the People's Commissariat for Nationalities. The first issue was published on March 8, 1918. Di Varhayt was the first Yiddish communist newspaper in the world. It was however closed down after a brief existence, as the People's Commissariat was shifted to the new capital Moscow and due to the lack of Yiddish journalists in Petrograd. The paper was later restarted as Der Emes.

References

Jewish anti-Zionism in Russia
Publications established in 1918
Yiddish communist newspapers
Newspapers published in Russia
Yiddish-language mass media in Russia
Mass media in Saint Petersburg
Secular Jewish culture in Europe